Tewksbury is a surname, derived from the town of Tewkesbury in Gloucestershire. Notable people with the surname include:

Bob Tewksbury (born 1960), American baseball pitcher
Mark Tewksbury (born 1968), Canadian swimmer
Peter Tewksbury (1923–2003), American filmmaker
Walter Tewksbury (1876–1968), American athlete

English-language surnames
English toponymic surnames